Quoya loxocarpa is a flowering plant in the mint family Lamiaceae and is endemic to Western Australia and the Northern Territory. It is an open shrub with many spindly tangled branches. The leaves are oblong and woolly when young and the flowers are whitish pink with purple spots inside and are surrounded by woolly sepals.

Description
Quoya loxocarpa is an open shrub with many spindly, interlacing branches mostly rising from the base of the plant. They have loose, woolly hairs when young but become glabrous as they mature.

The sepal tube is densely covered with purplish, woolly hairs on the outside and glabrous on the inside. The other four lobes are about half that size and roughly similar to each other. The outside of the petal tube is covered with short, soft hairs and is glabrous inside, apart from a ring of hairs around the ovary and a few long hairs on the largest petal lobe. The four stamens are shorter than the petal tube, the upper pair much shorter than the lower pair.

Taxonomy and naming
This species was first formally described in 1860 by Ferdinand von Mueller who gave it the name Chloanthes loxocarpa. The description was published in Fragmenta phytographiae Australiae from a specimen collected by Augustus Oldfield near the Murchison River. In 1917, George Druce changed the name to Pityrodia loxocarpa but in 2011, Barry Conn and Murray Henwood changed the name to Quoya loxocarpa and published the change in Australian Systematic Botany. The specific epithet (loxocarpa) is derived from the Ancient Greek words  meaning "slanting" and  meaning "fruit".

Distribution and habitat
This quoya mostly grows in shrubland in coastal areas in sand over limestone however it is also found in inland areas near Wiluna and Carnegie and near the border with South Australia and the Northern Territory. There are a few records from the Northern Territory.

Conservation
Quoya loxocarpa is classified as "not threatened" by the Western Australian Government Department of Parks and Wildlife.

References

loxocarpa
Plants described in 1860
Taxa named by Ferdinand von Mueller